Pedro José da Silva Trigueira (born 4 January 1988) is a Portuguese professional footballer who plays for U.D. Vilafranquense as a goalkeeper.

Club career
Trigueira was born in Baltar, Paredes. A product of Porto-based Boavista FC's youth ranks, he was promoted to the first team in 2007, serving a loan at modest G.D. Ribeirão to gain more experience. His professional debut was made in the 2008–09 season, playing eight matches in the second division as the former club was relegated for the second consecutive year.

Following Boavista's misfortunes, Trigueira signed in summer 2009 with Primeira Liga team Rio Ave FC, but was only third choice in his first year, behind experienced Carlos and Miguel Mora. More of the same in the 2010–11 campaign, as he appeared in only one league game (one minute against S.C. Olhanense in the last round) and added a further seven bench appearances.

From 2011 to 2015, Trigueira alternated between the second and third tiers of Portuguese football, representing C.D. Trofense, C.D. Cinfães and C.F. União. On 11 June 2015, after helping the latter return to the top flight after an absence of more than two decades, he joined Académica de Coimbra.

On 12 July 2016, after suffering top-division relegation, Trigueira signed a two-year deal with Vitória FC. In June 2018, he agreed to a contract of the same duration at Moreirense FC.

Trigueira moved to C.D. Tondela on 17 August 2020 on a two-year contract, as a replacement for FC Porto-bound Cláudio Ramos.

International career
Trigueira won the first of his four caps for the Portugal under-21 team on 10 February 2009, coming on as a late substitute in the 3–1 friendly win over Switzerland.

References

External links

1988 births
Living people
People from Paredes, Portugal
Sportspeople from Porto District
Portuguese footballers
Association football goalkeepers
Primeira Liga players
Liga Portugal 2 players
Segunda Divisão players
Boavista F.C. players
G.D. Ribeirão players
Rio Ave F.C. players
C.D. Trofense players
C.D. Cinfães players
C.F. União players
Associação Académica de Coimbra – O.A.F. players
Vitória F.C. players
Moreirense F.C. players
C.D. Tondela players
U.D. Vilafranquense players
Portugal youth international footballers
Portugal under-21 international footballers